The squat elimia (Elimia variata) is a species of freshwater snail with an operculum, aquatic gastropod mollusk in the family Pleuroceridae. This species is endemic to the United States.

References 
Citations

Bibliography

Molluscs of the United States
Elimia
Gastropods described in 1861
Taxonomy articles created by Polbot